Eliezer Zussman-Sofer (1828–1902) was a Hungarian rabbi and head of a yeshivah. He was the son of Rabbi Mordechai Efraim Fischel Sofer-Zussman of Pressburg and a son-in-law of Rabbi Joel Ungar of Shochtiz and Paks (Paks).

Zussman-Sofer was rabbi of Halas in 1850 and Paks in 1880. He authored a number of works including Yalkut Eliezer, Et Sofer, Meleah Ketoret and Damesek Eliezer.

All of his sons became rabbis:
Simon, rabbi in Sendra and Paks
Joseph Leib, rabbi in Derecske (author of Yalkut Sofer)
Judah, rabbi in Kadelburg, Yemring, Miklosh and Arad (author of Mate Yehudah and the father-in-law of Rabbi Chaim Sofer of Munkacs and Budapest)
Shmuel Benjamin, rabbi in Derecske (author of Divrei Sofrim).

His sons-in-law were Rabbi Yitzchok Yakov Blum of Sanshun (Hajdúsámson) and Kroly (Nagykároly and Rabbi Amram Fischer of Yunk .- Gyönk.

Zussman-Sofer died on the eve of Yom Kippur, October 1902.

References

19th-century Hungarian rabbis
1828 births
1902 deaths